J.W. McMillan may refer to:
 James W. McMillan (1825-1903), American soldier
 J.W. McMillan (brick manufacturer) (1850-1925), Scottish-American businessman